Grundy is a surname of French origin, common around Manchester, England.

People with the surname 
 Anthony Grundy (1979–2019), American basketball player
 Bill Grundy (1923–1993), British television presenter in the 1970s
 Edward Grundy (1795–1875), politician and editor in South Australia
 Emily Grundy (born 1955), British demographer and academic
 Eustace B. Grundy (1848–1938), lawyer in South Australia
 Felix Grundy (1777–1840), U.S. politician
 George Grundy (1859–1945), English cricketer
 George Beardoe Grundy (1861–1948), English historian
 Harry Grundy (1881 – after 1926), English footballer
 Harry Grundy (footballer, born 1893) (1893–1979), English footballer
 Hugh Grundy (born 1945), English drummer (The Zombies)
 Jimmy Grundy (politician) (1923–2020), American politician
 Joseph Ridgway Grundy (1863–1961), American industrialist and politician
 Patrick Michael Grundy (1917–1959; a.k.a. P. M. Grundy), English mathematician known for the Sprague–Grundy theorem
 Paul Grundy (engineer) (1935–2013), Australian engineer
 Rebecca Grundy (born 1990), English cricketer
 Reg Grundy (1923–2016), Australian television producer
 Stephan Grundy (born 1967), American author of saga retellings
 Sydney Grundy (1848–1914), English dramatist

See also
 Gundry

References